Yeong-jun, also spelled Yeong-joon, Young-jun, Young-joon, or in North Korea Yong-jun, is a Korean masculine given name. Its meaning differs based on the hanja used to write each syllable of the name. There are 34 hanja with the reading "yeong" and 34 hanja with the reading "jun" on the South Korean government's official list of hanja which may be registered for use in given names.

People with this name include:

Entertainers
Kim Young-joon (born 1963), stage name Yoo Ha, South Korean film director
Kim Young-joon (born 1988), stage name Kim Si-hoo, South Korean actor

Footballers
 Choi Young-jun (footballer, born 1965), South Korean football defender (K-League Classic)
 Kim Yong-jun (footballer) (born 1983), North Korean football midfielder
 Shin Young-jun (born 1989), South Korean football forward (K-League Challenge)
 Choi Young-jun (footballer, born 1991), South Korean football midfielder (K-League Challenge)
 Lee Young-jun (footballer), South Korean footballer

Other sportspeople
Kim Young-jun (wrestler) (born 1948), South Korean wrestler 
Park Yeong-jun (born 1965), South Korean track and field athlete
Kim Young-jun (tennis) (born 1980), South Korean tennis player
Ji Young-jun (born 1981), South Korean long-distance runner 
Byun Young-jun (born 1984), South Korean race walker 
Kang Young-jun (born 1987), South Korean volleyball player
Lee Young-jun (ice hockey) (born 1991), South Korean ice hockey centre
Seo Yeong-jun (born 1995), South Korean ice hockey defenceman
Won Young-jun (born 1998), South Korean swimmer

See also
List of Korean given names

References

Korean masculine given names